The 1932 Butler Bulldogs football team was an American football team that represented Butler University as an member of the Indiana Intercollegiate Conference (IIC) and the Missouri Valley Conference (MVC) during the 1932 college football season. In its first season under head coach Fred Mackey, the team compiled a 2–4–1 record with a 2–1 against IIC opponents and an 0–0–1 record in MVC play.

Schedule

References

Butler
Butler
Butler Bulldogs football seasons
Butler Bulldogs football